Sam Noom Sam Moom or Three Men, Three Styles is a Thai situation comedy originally broadcast from 1991 to 1998. It was created by Takonkiet Viravan for GMM Grammy subsidiary Exact, and starred Songsit Roongnophakunsri, Saksit Tangthong and Patiparn Patavekarn as the three titular brothers. It became Thailand's first widely popular sitcom, and launched the careers of its three main actors.

References

Thai sitcoms
1991 Thai television series debuts
1998 Thai television series endings
Television series by Exact & Scenario